Jimoh Aliu ,  (11 November 1939 – 17 September 2020), also known as Aworo, was a Nigerian dramatist, sculptor, film writer, playwright and director.

Early life
He was born on 11 November 1939 at Okemesi, a city in Ekiti State southwestern Nigeria.

His father, Aliu Fakoya, was an Ifa priest who hailed from Oke-Imesi while his mother hailed from Iloro-Ekiti.

Career
Aliu began acting in 1959 when Akin Ogungbe, a Nigerian veteran dramatist visited his hometown, the same year he joined the Akin Ogungbe theatre group where he gained some experience in drama.
In 1966, after he spent seven years with the Ogungbe troupe, he established "Jimoh Aliu Concert Party", a group based in Ikare in Ondo State southwestern Nigeria.

He later joined the Nigerian Army in 1967 but retired in 1975 with the aim of focusing on drama as well as promoting independent artists under the platform of Jimoh Aliu cultural group.
He had produced several television drama series such as Iku Jare Eda Yanpan yanrin and Fopomoyo that featured king Sunny Ade, a good friend of Jimoh Aliu's. It was later learned that his good friend, Sunny Ade, slept with his wife, Orisabunmi. Jimoh Aliu ultimately forgave his friend but eventually divorced Orisabunmi.

The major character,  Fadeyi Oloro, played by Ojo Arowosegbe became a significant part of Jimoh Aliu's production. This Fadeyi Oloro was originally played by another member of the Jimoh Aliu group (in defunct Ondo State) before Ojo Arowosegbe later joined the group. The wife of the original Fadeyi Oloro also played the original Orisabunmi character before the last (widely known chactacter) featured Orisabunmi.

Death
Aliu died at Ekiti State University Teaching Hospital in Ado-Ekiti on 17 September 2020 after a brief illness. He was 80 years old.

Filmography
Fopomoyo
Yanpan yanrin
Ajalu
Arelu
 Igbo Olodumare
 Irinkerindo Ninu Igbo Elegbeje
 rukerudo

Awards
Member of the Federal Republic of Niger

References

1939 births
2020 deaths
Yoruba male actors
Male actors in Yoruba cinema
20th-century Nigerian male actors
Yoruba dramatists and playwrights
Nigerian dramatists and playwrights
Nigerian male film actors
Male actors from Ekiti State
21st-century Nigerian male actors
Entertainers from Ekiti State
Members of the Order of the Federal Republic
Nigerian film directors
Nigerian sculptors
Actors from Ekiti State